Tanquana is a genus of flowering plants belonging to the family Aizoaceae.

Its native range is South African Republic.

Species:
 Tanquana archeri (L.Bolus) H.Hartmann & Liede 
 Tanquana hilmarii (L.Bolus) H.Hartmann & Liede 
 Tanquana prismatica (Schwantes) H.Hartmann & Liede

References

Aizoaceae
Aizoaceae genera